(15820) 1994 TB is a trans-Neptunian object residing in the Kuiper belt. It is in a 3:2 orbital resonance with Neptune, similar to Pluto. It was discovered on October 2, 1994, by David C. Jewitt and Jun Chen at the Mauna Kea Observatory, in Hawaii.

References

External links
 

Plutinos
1994 TB
1994 TB
19941002